"Lies" / "Don't Drive My Car" is a double A-side single released by the British rock band Status Quo in 1980.

Lies
"Lies" was considered to be the most commercial of the two. Both songs were included on the album Just Supposin'.

250,000 copies were issued with a picture sleeve; the first 100,000 printed in colour, the rest were printed in black and white.

Don't Drive My Car
"Don't Drive My Car" was mispressed twice - once as "Don't Drive My CAF" (French pressing) and once as "Don't Drive MYICAR" (later UK pressing).

The song was reprised, in 2014, for the band's thirty-first studio album Aquostic (Stripped Bare). It was featured in the ninety-minute launch performance of the album at London's Roundhouse on 22 October, the concert being recorded and broadcast live by BBC Radio 2 as part of their In Concert series.

Track listing 
 "Lies" (Rossi/Frost) (3.56)
 "Don't Drive My Car" (Parfitt/Bown) (4.12)

Charts

Certifications

References 

Status Quo (band) songs
1980 singles
Songs written by Rick Parfitt
Songs written by Francis Rossi
Songs written by Andy Bown
Vertigo Records singles